Alhambra Shopping Centre, also known by its former name The Mall Barnsley, is Barnsley's main shopping complex, housing 41 shops and adjacent to Barnsley Market. The centre was opened in 1991. A number of chains have been in the centre in the past, most notable was Woolworths which ceased trading in December 2008. It was owned and operated by shopping centre operator The Mall Company until its sale to F&C REIT in September 2011. In the centre there are a number of small retail stalls which encourage independent businesses to start.

Current stores (as of January 2023) include:

Primark, the Works, Select, Bonmarche, CeX, Iceland, Vodafone, Wilko, Poundstretcher, Card factory, MaxiDeals and Hays travel.

References

External links
Alhambra Shopping Centre
The Mall Barnsley
The Mall Barnsley on The Retail Database

Shopping centres in South Yorkshire
Buildings and structures in Barnsley